Ryers station is a station located along SEPTA's Fox Chase Line. It is located at Cottman and Rockwell Avenues and has a 71-space parking lot. In FY 2013, Ryers station had a weekday average of 402 boardings and 376 alightings. The station itself consists of a new high-level platform and shelter, completed in early 2012.

Station layout

Gallery

References

External links 

 Current schedule for the SEPTA Fox Chase/Newtown line
 SEPTA station page for Ryers
 Cottman Avenue entrance from Google Maps Street View
 Reconstruction Project (RR Picture Archives)

SEPTA Regional Rail stations